Roustam Raza (arm Ռուստամ Ռուզա) (Georgian: როსტომ რაზმაძე, Rostom Razmadze) (1783 – 7 December 1845), also known as Roustan or Rustam, was a mamluk bodyguard and secondary valet of Napoleon.

Early life
Roustam was born in Tiflis, Kingdom of Kartli-Kakheti (present-day Tbilisi, Georgia). He was of Armenian origin;  however, he considered himself Georgian. At thirteen he was kidnapped and sold into slavery in Cairo. The Turks gave him the name Idzhahia. The Sheikh of Cairo presented him to General Napoleon Bonaparte in 1798, during the French campaign in Egypt.

In the service of Napoleon

Roustam served Napoleon for fifteen years, travelling with the First Consul and subsequent Emperor on all of his campaigns. The mamluk's role was that of a personal attendant, taking care of Napoleon's weapons and clothing, and supervising the serving of his meals. Acting as a bodyguard he slept near to the emperor. On ceremonial occasions, such as the coronation of 1804, Roustam would be in attendance dressed in full "oriental" costume.

Later life
In 1814 Roustam married Mademoiselle Douville in Dourdan and refused to follow the Emperor in his exile to Elba after the first Bourbon Restoration. He offered his service to Napoleon during the Hundred Days, but the recently re-crowned emperor refused to even receive him and spoke bitterly of Raza's "betrayal" in his recollections written at St. Helena.

Raza later claimed that he feared Napoleon would commit suicide and that he would be blamed for his death. He cited this as the reason he left Napoleon during the marshals' revolt, just prior to the emperor's abdication.
Raza's position as second valet was filled during the Hundred Days restoration by his former assistant and the Imperial Librarian, Louis Étienne Saint-Denis, whom Napoleon took to calling Ali. Like Raza, Saint-Denis also wrote an autobiography about his time in Napoleon's Service.

On 7 December 1845, Roustam died in Dourdan. His memoirs of his service to Napoleon were first published in 1888.

See also 
 Mamelukes of the Imperial Guard

References

External links
 Roustam Raza's memoirs online 
 Souvenirs de Roustam, mamelouck de Napoléon Ier Introduction et notes de Paul Cottin 

First French Empire
Bodyguards
Emigrants from the Ottoman Empire to France
People from Tbilisi
1783 births
1845 deaths
French people of Armenian descent
Georgian people of Armenian descent
Mamluks
18th-century slaves
Napoleon
Egyptian slaves